Philippe of Anjou (Philippe d'Anjou) may refer to:

Philip I, Prince of Taranto (1278-1332)
Philip II, Prince of Taranto (1329-1374)
Philippe I, Duke of Orléans (1640-1701), titled Duke of Anjou at birth
Philippe-Charles, Duke of Anjou (1668-1671), second son of Louis XIV of France
Philip V of Spain (1683–1746), titled Duke of Anjou at birth
Philippe of France (1730–1733), son of Louis XV of France